Marcelo Oliveira Silva known as Marcelinho (born 10 September 1984) is a Brazilian football player.

External links
  Profile at official Aalborg BK Website

1984 births
Living people
Brazilian footballers
Brazilian expatriate footballers
Campeonato Brasileiro Série A players
Clube Atlético Mineiro players
Avaí FC players
Primeira Liga players
Associação Naval 1º de Maio players
Sharjah FC players
Al Wahda FC players
UAE Pro League players
Fluminense FC players
Clube Náutico Capibaribe players
Brazilian expatriate sportspeople in Portugal
Brazilian expatriate sportspeople in the United Arab Emirates
Expatriate footballers in Portugal
Expatriate footballers in the United Arab Emirates
Association football forwards